Eva Yocheved Andrei is an American condensed matter physicist, currently a Distinguished Professor and Board of Governors Professor at Rutgers University.  Her research focuses on emergent properties of matter arising from collective behavior of many particles, especially low-dimensional phenomena under low temperatures and high magnetic fields.

Education and training
Andrei was born in Bucharest, Romania. She received her bachelor's degree from Tel Aviv University in Israel and her Ph.D. from Rutgers University in the United States. She then worked as a postdoctoral fellow at Bell Labs.

Career
Andrei began her independent career in 1987 as an assistant professor at Rutgers.  One of her first major contributions was establishing the existence of a Wigner solid in a 2D electron plasma.  More recently she has made major contributions to the study of graphene, including detection of ballistic transport of charge carriers and the observation of Van Hove singularity in twisted bilayer graphene. Andrei's discovery of the fractional quantum Hall effect in graphene was one of Science magazines top ten discoveries for the year 2009. Through studying moiré patterns when sheets of graphene are twisted, Andrei observed the alignment of electrons which could facilitate the use of graphene in supercomputers. Andrei's research has also presented the possibility that graphene could be used to cool supercomputers and has revealed new ways of making flat bands within twisted graphene which may be used to make superlattice structures.

Selected publications

Awards and honors
Fellow of the National Academy of Sciences (2013)
Fellow of the American Association for the Advancement of Science (2010)
Fellow of the American Academy of Arts and Sciences (2012)
Fellow of the American Physical Society

References

External links 

 Oral history interview, conducted December 27, 2016

Year of birth missing (living people)
Living people
Scientists from Bucharest
Fellows of the American Association for the Advancement of Science
Rutgers University faculty
Tel Aviv University alumni
Rutgers University alumni
Fellows of the American Physical Society
Condensed matter physicists